Salix exigua (sandbar willow, narrowleaf willow, or coyote willow; syn. S. argophylla, S. hindsiana, S. interior, S. linearifolia, S. luteosericea, S. malacophylla, S. nevadensis, and  S. parishiana) is a species of willow native to most of North America except for the southeast and far north, occurring from Alaska east to New Brunswick, and south to northern Mexico. It is considered a threatened species in Massachusetts while in Connecticut, Maryland, and New Hampshire it is considered endangered.

Description
It is a deciduous shrub reaching  in height, exceptionally  spreading by basal shoots to form dense clonal colonies. The flowers are produced in catkins in late spring, after the leaves appear. The fruit is a cluster of capsules, each containing numerous minute seeds embedded in shiny white silk.

Subspecies and Variants
The two subspecies, which meet in the western Great Plains, are:
S. exigua  subsp. interior (Rowlee) Cronq. (syn.
In California and Oregon,
S. exigua var. hindsiana – Hinds' willow

Cultivation
Salix exigua is cultivated as an ornamental tree. In the UK it has gained the Royal Horticultural Society’s Award of Garden Merit.

Uses
This willow has many uses for Native Americans; the branches are used as flexible poles and building materials, the smaller twigs are used to make baskets, the bark is made into cord and string, and the bark and leaves have several medicinal uses. The Zuni people take an infusion of the bark for coughs and sore throats.

The foliage is browsed by livestock.

Ecology
The male flowers provide pollen for bees.  It is a larval host to the California hairstreak, Lorquin's admiral, mourning cloak, sylvan hairstreak, and tiger swallowtail.

References

External links
 
 Dominguez M. Collet (2004), Willows of Interior Alaska, US Fish and Wildlife Service
 
 
 

exigua
Fiber plants
Flora of Western Canada
Flora of Alaska
Flora of the Northwestern United States
Flora of the Southwestern United States
Flora of California
Flora of Northwestern Mexico
Flora of the United States
Flora of the North-Central United States
Flora of the Northeastern United States
Flora of the Southeastern United States
Flora of the Appalachian Mountains
Flora of the Cascade Range
Flora of the Klamath Mountains
Flora of the Sierra Nevada (United States)
Flora of the Rocky Mountains
Flora of the California desert regions
Flora of the Great Basin
Flora of the Sonoran Deserts
Flora of Kansas
Flora of New Mexico
Flora of Texas
Flora of the Rio Grande valleys
Natural history of the California chaparral and woodlands
Natural history of the California Coast Ranges
Natural history of the Central Valley (California)
Natural history of the Mojave Desert
Natural history of the Peninsular Ranges
Natural history of the Transverse Ranges
Plants used in traditional Native American medicine
Endangered flora of the United States
Taxa named by Thomas Nuttall
Flora without expected TNC conservation status